Joseph Richard Kernen (born January 6, 1956) is an American news anchor who is the co-host of Squawk Box on CNBC.

Early life and education
Kernen grew up in Western Hills, Cincinnati and graduated from St. Xavier High School in 1974. He holds a bachelor's degree from the University of Colorado Boulder and a master’s degree in molecular biology from the Massachusetts Institute of Technology, where he worked on cancer research.

Career
Kernen came to CNBC in the 1991 merger with Financial News Network, having joined FNN after a 10-year career as a stockbroker.

In 1995, he became the co-host of Squawk Box.

Controversies

Imitation of Indian accent

On September 20 of 2013, Kernen imitated an Indian accent on CNBC's "Squawk Box" program while discussing banknotes from India, and asked if the Indian rupee is accepted as currency at 7-Eleven stores. He later stated, "Last Friday, I made an inappropriate and insensitive remark on Squawk Box. I apologize for any offense it caused."

Irish geography
In November 2014, during an on-air interview, Kernen asked IDA Ireland chief executive Martin Shanahan why Ireland did not use the pound sterling and asked if Ireland and Scotland were not on the same island. Critics say Kernen appeared to believe that Republic of Ireland was part of the United Kingdom while ignoring the fact that Northern Ireland is indeed part of the UK.

Personal life
Kernen is married to Penelope Scott Kernen, a former commodities trader from Short Hills, New Jersey. They met after she joined CNBC in 1996 and were married in 1998 on a golf course.

His nicknames are "The Kahuna" and "The Hair".

Bibliography
Kernen authored Your Teacher Said What?!: Defending Our Kids from the Liberal Assault on Capitalism, (2011) with his then 5th grade daughter Blake.

See also
 List of journalists in New York City

References

1956 births
Living people
St. Xavier High School (Ohio) alumni
University of Colorado Boulder alumni
Massachusetts Institute of Technology School of Science alumni
Television personalities from Cincinnati
American television news anchors
American stockbrokers
CNBC people
Writers from Ohio